Meloland (formerly Gleason Switch) is an unincorporated community in Imperial County, California.

A post office operated at Meloland from 1908 to 1911.

The University of California Agriculture and Natural Resources's Desert Research and Extension Center is located at Meloland.

References

Unincorporated communities in Imperial County, California
El Centro metropolitan area
Unincorporated communities in California